St. Peter's Cathedral is a Roman Catholic church located at Golan Square (Place du Golan) in downtown Rabat, Morocco. It was erected in the early 20th century in the Art Deco style. The cathedral is dedicated to Saint Peter, and is the ecclesiastical seat of the Archdiocese of Rabat.

Construction of the cathedral began in 1919, and its chief architect was Adrien Laforgue. The cathedral was inaugurated by Resident-General Hubert Lyautey in 1921. The two towers of the cathedral, were added in the 1930s. 

The cathedral is currently operational, and Mass is celebrated every other day.

Images

See also 

 Casablanca Cathedral
 French Church of Tangier
 Roman Catholic Cathedral of Tangier
 St. Francis of Assisi Cathedral, Laayoune
 Our Lady of Mount Carmel Church, Dakhla

Religious buildings and structures in Rabat
Art Deco architecture
Roman Catholic cathedrals in Morocco
1921 establishments in Morocco
20th-century architecture in Morocco